Víctor J. Gárate (born September 25, 1984 in Maracay, Venezuela) is a former professional baseball pitcher. He  played in Major League Baseball (MLB) for the Washington Nationals, in Nippon Professional Baseball (NPB) for the Hokkaido Nippon-Ham Fighters and in Chinese Professional Baseball League (CPBL) for the EDA Rhinos.

Career
Gárate was signed by the Houston Astros as an amateur free agent in 2005, and made his professional debut with the Greeneville Astros in the Appalachian League. He was 4–1 with a 5.57 ERA during the 19 games he pitched in relief that season. The next two seasons he spent with the Tri-City ValleyCats and the Lexington Legends.

He was selected by the Dodgers in the minor league phase of the Rule 5 draft in 2007, and played with the Great Lakes Loons and the Inland Empire 66ers of San Bernardino. He was added to the Dodgers' 40 man roster prior to the 2009 season and spent the season with the Double-A Chattanooga Lookouts.

On September 2, 2009 the Dodgers sent Gárate to the Washington Nationals to complete the trade for infielder Ronnie Belliard. Two days later, the Nationals placed him on their active roster and he made his debut on September 5. In four games he allowed five runs in two innings.

On July 12, 2012, Gárate was released by the Milwaukee Brewers organization. Gárate was signed by the York Revolution of the Atlantic League of Professional Baseball on July 19, but was released a week later on July 26, 2012.

On November 19, 2014, Garate was signed by Hokkaido Nippon-Ham Fighters the Nippon Professional Baseball in Japan.

Garate signed with the Saraperos de Saltillo of the Mexican Baseball League for the 2016 season. He was released on June 8, 2016.

In 2018, he played with San Marino in the Italian Baseball League.

See also
 List of Major League Baseball players from Venezuela

References

External links

Pura Pelota (VPBL)
Garate, Loons set strikeout records

1984 births
Living people
Chattanooga Lookouts players
CTBC Brothers players
Great Lakes Loons players
Greeneville Astros players
EDA Rhinos players
Harrisburg Senators players
Hokkaido Nippon-Ham Fighters players
Inland Empire 66ers of San Bernardino players
Leones del Caracas players
Lexington Legends players
Major League Baseball pitchers
Major League Baseball players from Venezuela
Mexican League baseball pitchers
Nashville Sounds players
New Orleans Zephyrs players
Nippon Professional Baseball pitchers
Sportspeople from Maracay
Saraperos de Saltillo players
Syracuse Chiefs players
T & A San Marino players
Tri-City ValleyCats players
Venezuelan expatriate baseball players in Japan
Venezuelan expatriate baseball players in Mexico
Venezuelan expatriate baseball players in Taiwan
Venezuelan expatriate baseball players in the United States
Venezuelan expatriate baseball players in San Marino
Venezuelan Summer League Venoco 1/2 players
Washington Nationals players
York Revolution players